This is a list of zoos in Bangladesh.

Zoos are primarily dry facilities where animals are confined within enclosures and displayed to the public, and in which they may also be bred. Such facilities include zoos, safari parks, animal theme parks, aviaries, butterfly zoos, and reptile centres, as well as wildlife sanctuaries and nature reserves where visitors are allowed.

Bangladesh is a small country and has few government-owned zoos. However many areas of the country, notably many islands in the Bay of Bengal, are governed as natural zoological gardens.

Zoos in Bangladesh
 Bangabandhu Sheikh Mujib Safari Park
 Bangladesh National Zoo
 Bonobilash Zoo
 Chittagong Zoo
 Comilla Zoo and Botanical Garden
 Gazipur Borendra Park
 Khulna Zoo
 Nijhum Dhip Park
 Rajshahi Zoo
 Rangpur Zoo
 Shaheed A.H.M Qamaruzzaman Central Park and Zoo

See also
List of zoos
SAZARC

 
Bangladesh
Zoos